Knitting Needles and Bicycle Bells is the debut album of Tenement Halls, the name used by Chris Lopez for his solo work.  The album was released in 2005 by Merge.

Track listing

References

2005 debut albums
Merge Records albums